Cyperus ischnos is a species of sedge that is native to southern parts of North America, Central America and northern parts of South America.

See also 
 List of Cyperus species

References 

ischnos
Plants described in 1849
Flora of Bolivia
Flora of Belize
Flora of Colombia
Flora of Costa Rica
Flora of El Salvador
Flora of Honduras
Flora of Mexico
Flora of Nicaragua
Flora of Panama
Flora of Venezuela
Taxa named by Diederich Franz Leonhard von Schlechtendal